The following is a list of works by P.D.Q. Bach, a fictitious Bach family member, the alter ego of composer Peter Schickele. The first section lists, in alphabetical order, those works which have been recorded, are listed in the annotated catalogue of P. D. Q. Bach music in The Definitive Biography of P.D.Q. Bach, and/or are listed on the Theodore Presser website. "Schickele numbers", or "S." numbers, associated with most of the compositions, have been assigned arbitrarily (with humorous intent) and are not intended to provide the same service as Bach-Werke-Verzeichnis (BWV) numbers, also known, especially in early compilations, as "Schmieder numbers" or "S. numbers" after compiler Wolfgang Schmieder. The second section lists "undiscovered works" that are mentioned in The Definitive Biography. The third section lists works by Schickele that have appeared on P.D.Q. Bach recordings. The fourth section lists a few selections, not by P.D Q. Bach/Schickele, that have appeared on P.D.Q. Bach recordings.

The works of P.D.Q. Bach
1712 Overture, S. 1712
The Abduction of Figaro, a simply grand opera in three acts, S. 384, 492
Allegretto Gabinetto for Plumber and Keyboarder, S. 2nd Door on the Left 
The Art of the Ground Round, S. 1.19/lb
Birthday Ode to "Big Daddy" Bach, S. 100
Breakfast Antiphonies, S. 8:30 
Canine Cantata: Wachet, Arf! (Sleeping Dogs, Awake!), S. K9 
Cantata: Blaues Gras (Bluegrass Cantata), S. 6 string
Cantata: Iphigenia in Brooklyn, S. 53,162
Cantata: Singalonga Meloir Cave Canem
Canzon Per Sonar a Sei – Count Them – Sei, S. 6
Canzonetta La Hooplina (The Girl from Hoople), S. 16 going on 30
Capriccio La Pucelle de New Orleans (The Maid of New Orleans), S. under 18
Choral Prelude: "Ah", S. 1636
Choral Prelude: "Should", S. 365 
Classical Rap, S. 1–2–3
Concerto for Bassoon vs. Orchestra, S. 8′ 
Concerto for Horn and Hardart, S. 27
Concerto for Piano vs. Orchestra, S. 88 
Concerto for Simply Grand Piano and Orchestra, S. 99%
Concerto for Two Pianos vs. Orchestra, S. 2 are better than one
A Consort of Choral Christmas Carols, S. 359
Desecration of the House Overture, S. 10-9-8-7-6-5-4-3-2-1
Diverse Ayres on Sundrie Notions, S. 99 44/100
"Dutch" Suite in G Major, S. −16
Echo Sonata for Two Unfriendly Groups of Instruments, S. 9999999
Eine Kleine Kiddiemusik for Three Toyists and Orchestra, S. One-Potato-Two-Potato-Three-Potato-Four
"Erotica" Variations" for banned instruments and piano, S. 36EE
Fanfare for Fred, S. F4F
Fanfare for the Common Cold, S. 98.7 
Fantasieshtick, S. 1001 
Four Curmudgeonly Canons, S. 365
Four Folk Song Upsettings, S. 4
Four Next-to-Last Songs, S. Ω – 1
Fugue of the Volga Boatmen, S. 1-2-3-grunt
Goldbrick Variations, S. 14
Grand Serenade for an Awful Lot of Winds and Percussion, S. 1000
Gross Concerto No. 1 for divers flutes, two trumpets, and strings, S. −2 
Gross Concerto No. 2 for flutoid instruments and orchestra, S. −1 
Hansel and Gretel and Ted and Alice, an opera in one unnatural act, S. 2n−1
Hindenburg Concerto, S. Lz 129
"Howdy" Symphony in D Major, S. 6⅞
Knock, Knock, choral cantata, S. 4/1
Konzertschtick for Two Violins Mit Orchestra, S. 2+ 
Liebeslieder Polkas for mixed chorus and piano five hands, S. 2/4
Lip My Reeds, S. 32'
A Little Nightmare Music, an opera in one irrevocable act, S. 35
Little Notebook for "Piggy" Bach
Little Pickle Book (Pöckelbüchlein) for theater organ and dill piccolos, S. 6
Long Live the King, S. 1789
The Magic Bassoon, a tragicommodity in one act, S. 7
March of the Cute Little Wood Sprites, S. Onesy Twosy
Minuet Militaire, S. 1A
Missa Hilarious, S. N20
The Musical Sacrifice, S. 50% off
No-no Nonette, for assorted winds and toys, S. 86
Notebook for Betty-Sue Bach, S. 13 going on 14 
Octoot, for wind instruments, S. 8
Odden und Enden
Oedipus Tex, opera/dramatic oratorio, S. 150
The Only Piece Ever Written for Violin and Tuba, S. 9, 10, big fat hen
Oratorio: The Seasonings, S. ½ tsp.
Overture to La clemenza di Genghis Khan, S. 1227 
Perückenstück (Hair Piece) from The Civilian Barber, S. 4F
Pervertimento for Bagpipes, Bicycle and Balloons, S. 66
The Preachers of Crimetheus, a ballet in one selfless act, S. 988
Prelude to Einstein on the Fritz, S. e=mt2
Royal Firewater Musick, for bottles and orchestra, S. 1/5
"Safe" Sextet, S. R33–L45–R(pass it once)78
The "Sanka" Cantata
Schleptet in E Major, S. 0
Serenude, for devious instruments, S. 36–24–36 
Shepherd on the Rocks with a Twist, S. 12 to 1 
The Short-Tempered Clavier, Preludes and Fugues in All the Major and Minor Keys Except for the Really Hard Ones, S. easy as 3.14159265
Sinfonia Concertante, S. 98.6
Six Contrary Dances, S. 39
Sonata ”Abassoonata”, S. 888
Sonata Da Circo ("Circus Sonata") for steam calliope, S. 3 ring
Sonata for Viola Four Hands and Harpsichord, S. 440 
Sonata Innamorata, S. 1 + 1
Sonata Piccola, S. 8va
The Stoned Guest, a half-act opera, S. 86 proof
String Quartet in F Major "The Moose", S. Y2K
Suite from The Civilian Barber, S. 4F
Suite No. 1 for Cello All By Its Lonesome, S. 1a 
Suite No. 2 for Cello All By Its Lonesome, S. 1b 
Three Chorale-Based Piecelets for organ, S. III
Three Teeny Preludes, S. 001
Toot Suite for calliope four hands, S. 212°
Traumarei for unaccompanied piano, S. 13
Trio (sic) Sonata, S. 3(4)
The "Trite" Quintet, S. 6 of 1, Half a Dozen of the Other 
Twelve Quite Heavenly Songs ("Aire Proprio Zodicale"), S. 16°
Two Hearts, Four Lips, Three Little Words, S. 9
Two Madrigals from The Triumphs of Thusnelda, S. 1601
Variations on an Unusually Simple-Minded Theme, S. 1

The "Undiscovered" works of P.D.Q. Bach
The Barren Gypsy
The Civilian Barber 
The Dairy Queen 
Einstein on the Fritz 
Famous Last Words of Christ
Half-Nelson Mass
Madame Butterbrickle
The Magic Fruit
The Mass in the Allah Mode
Neo-Trio Sonata
The Passion According to Hoyle
Rosenkavalier and Guildenstern

Works by Prof. Peter Schickele appearing on P.D.Q. Bach recordings
Bach Portrait
Chaconne à son Goût
Eine Kleine Nichtmusik
Last Tango in Bayreuth
New Horizons in Music Appreciation: Beethoven's Symphony No. 5 Commentary (with Robert Dennis)
Quodlibet
"Unbegun" Symphony

Other works featured on P.D.Q. Bach recordings
What's My Melodic Line? (featuring works by Archangelo Spumoni, fictitious composer)

by Leiber & Stoller
Hound Dog
Love Me

References

Sources
The recordings of P. D. Q. Bach
As listed in The Definitive Biography of P.D.Q. Bach by Prof. Peter Schickele (Random House: New York, 1976)
As listed on the Theodore Presser Company website (Note: some of these may be works by Prof. Schickele and not by P.D.Q. Bach. The website is not clear who wrote some of the pieces.)

External links
The Peter Schickele/P.D.Q. Homepage
P.D.Q. Bach's page on Theodore Presser Company
Compositions

Works
Bach, PDQ